Giovanni Alberti may refer to:
 Giovanni Alberti (painter) (1558–1601), Italian painter
 Giovanni Alberti (mathematician) (born 1965), Italian mathematician